26th (Saarland) Airborne Brigade is a formation in the Special Operations Division of the German Army with a strength of about 3,500 men and its brigade headquarters in Saarlouis. The Brigade is also called the Saarland Brigade as almost all its troops are stationed in the federal state of Saarland. Other elements are based in Rhineland-Palatinate. Most of the 26th Airborne Brigade belongs to the intervention forces of the Bundeswehr, and the formation therefore provides the overwhelming proportion of paratroopers and airborne troops for the intervention forces of the Army.  The Brigade motto is: Einsatzbereit – jederzeit – weltweit ("Ready for action - anytime - worldwide"). The Brigade greeting is "Glück ab".

The brigade was previously part of the 1st Airborne Division alongside the 25th and 27th Luftlande Brigades.

Commanders 
The brigade commanders were (rank on takeover):

See also 
 Special Operations Division
 German Army Forces Command

References

Literature 
Sören Sünkler: Die Spezialverbände der Bundeswehr. Stuttgart: Motorbuch Verlag 2007. 
Sören Sünkler: K-ISOM 1. Ausgabe 2008, Artikel LLBrig. 26, Sept.-Okt. 2008, KOMMANDO- International Special Operations Magazine .

External links 
 Official website of the Brigade
 Federal archive of the Brigade
 Official page of 261 Parachute Battalion
 3./FschJgBtl 261
 Video at tagesschau.de Report about degrading behaviour in the barracks in Zweibrücken

Airborne brigades of the German Army
Brigades of the Bundeswehr
Military units and formations established in 1958
Military units and formations disestablished in 2015
1958 establishments in Germany